(the) Field of View (フィールド・オブ・ビュー Fīrudo obu Byū) were a Japanese pop rock band formed in 1994 by vocalist U-ya Asaoka, guitarist Takashi Oda, keyboardist Jun Abe and drummer Takuto Kohashi, with Jun Abe leaving and Kenji Niitsu joining the following year. The group's tenure lasted until their break up in December 2002.

One of their hit singles, Dan Dan Kokoro Hikareteku, was used as the opening theme for the popular anime series Dragon Ball GT.
Another single, 「渇いた叫び」(Kawaita Sakebi), was used as the opening for the original Yu-Gi-Oh! series from Toei in 1998.

Biography
The group was formed on February 9, 1994 when vocalist U-ya Asaoka, guitarist Takashi Oda, keyboardist Jun Abe and drummer (later bandleader) Takuto Kohashi signed up for Being's Zain Records label under the name of view. They released 2 singles under the name 'view'. Just after the Last Goodbye EP in 1995, Abe left the group and bassist Kenji Niitsu joined. 

After the Truth of Love EP in 2001, "the" was added in front of the band name for later releases. In 1996, the band gave their first concert, Live Horizon Version 1. Version 2 followed in 1997 and Live Horizon Version 3 in 1999. On June 25, 1999, they performed in the Dublin Castle in London. The Field of View broke up one month after their November 2002 performances held in Tokyo and Osaka. On December 1, 2002, the Field of View performed Field of View Live Horizon - The Final: Gift of Extra Emotion as their final concert. In all, they released 22 singles, 5 studio albums and 5 best albums.

The band reunited (without the former guitarist takashi oda) for the first time in 10 years in 2012, during special live event held by music company Being Inc.-Being Legend Live Tour 2012. 

On January 26, 2020, through U-ya Asaoka's official website, a new compilation album for the celebration of  the 25th anniversary of the band's debut with 5 new songs and previously unpublished songs was announced. The band will reform for two live shows in Tokyo and Osaka for the first time since 2012.

Members
U-ya Asaoka (浅岡雄也) - vocals, lyrics, composition
Takuto Kohashi (小橋琢人) - drums, lyrics, composition
Takashi Oda (小田孝) - guitar, composition
Kenji Niitsu (新津健二) - bass guitar, composition, arrangement

Former Member
Jun Abe (安部潤) - keyboards, arrangement
left group after releasing 3rd single Last Goodbye

Discography

Studio albums

Field of View I (1995)
Field of View II (1996)
Field of View III ~Now Here No Where~ (1998)
Lovely Jubbly (1999)
Capsule Monster (2000)

References

External links
Anniversary Official Website
Being site of Field of View
Old Official Site (WebArchived)

Japanese pop rock music groups
Nippon Columbia artists
Being Inc. artists
Musical groups established in 1994
Musical groups disestablished in 2002
1994 establishments in Japan
2002 disestablishments in Japan